The Niépce Prize has been awarded annually since 1955 to a professional photographer who has lived and worked in France for over 3 years and is younger than 50 years (previously 45 years) of age. It was introduced in honour of Joseph Nicéphore Niépce by Albert Plécy and Paul Almásy for the l'Association Gens d'Images.

History 
The Prix Niépce Gens d'images "rewards each year the work of a professional photographer residing in France for more than three years, and aged under 50 at most on January 1 of the year for which he competes. It is supported by the Ministry of Culture and by the National Library of France, a historical institutional partner which hosts the deliberations and the proclamation of the prize.

From 2011 to 2015, it is financially endowed by the film company MK2, directed by Marin Karmitz. Since 2016, it is endowed by the Picto Foundation, the endowment fund of the Picto laboratories which rewards the winner, designs and produces with The Eyes Publishing an artist's book. Since 2019, it has also benefited from the patronage of ADAGP, Society of authors in the graphic and plastic arts.

List of winners 

 1954: Jean Dieuzaide
 1956: Robert Doisneau
 1957: Denis Brihat
 1958: René Basset
 1959: Jeanloup Sieff
 1960: Léon Herschtritt
 1961: Jean-Dominique Lajoux
 1962: Jean-Louis Swiners
 1963: Jean Suquet
 1964: Jean Garet
 1965: Thierry Davoust
 1966: Marc Garanger and Rudolf Lichtsteiner
 1967: Pierre and Dorine Berdoy
 1968: Claude Sauvageot
 1969: Jean-Pierre Ducatez
 1970: Serge Chirol and Claude-Raimond Dityvon
 1971: Jean-Luc Tartarin
 1972: Pierre Le Gall and Guillaume Lieury
 1973: Albert Visage
 1974: Pierre Michaud
 1975: Jean-Louis Nou
 1976: Eddie Kuligowski, Claude Nuridsany and Marie Pérennou
 1977: Roland Laboye
 1978: Alain Chartier
 1979: Françoise Saur
 1980: Gilles Kervella
 1981: Frédéric Brenner and Jacques Bondon
 1982: Not awarded
 1983: Pascal Dolémieux
 1984: Thierry Girard
 1985: Hervé Rabot
 1986: Jean-Marc Zaorski
 1987: Agnès Bonnot
 1988: Keiichi Tahara
 1989: Gladys and Patrick Zachmann
 1990: Hugues de Wurstemberger
 1991: Jean-Louis Courtinat
 1992: Luc Choquer
 1993: Jean-Claude Coutausse
 1994: Xavier Lambours
 1995: Marie-Paule Nègre
 1996: Lise Sarfati
 1997: Patrick Tosani
 1998: Florence Chevallier
 1999: Philippe Bazin
 2000: Klavdij Sluban
 2001: Antoine D'Agata
 2002: Luc Delahaye
 2003: Stéphane Couturier
 2004: Claudine Doury
 2005: Elina Brotherus
 2006: Onodera Yuki
 2007: Bertrand Meunier
 2008: Jürgen Nefzger
 2009: Stéphanie Lacombe
 2010: Jean-Christian Bourcart
 2011: Guillaume Herbaut
 2012: Denis Darzacq
 2013: Valérie Jouve
 2014: Mathieu Pernot
 2015: Laurent Millet
 2016: Laurence Leblanc
 2017: Olivier Culmann
 2018: 
 2019: 
 2020:

References

External links

 Website about Niépce 
 Website about Niépce 
 University of Texas exhibition site on "The First Photograph"
 Documentary video on restoration of Nicephore Niepce's home
 Home page of the 'Niépce prize' at the association Gens d'Images

Photography in France
French awards
Photography awards
Awards established in 1955
1955 establishments in France